Claudia Marx (born 16 September 1978 in East Berlin) is a German athlete. She runs in the 400 metres and the 400 metres hurdles (which she started in 2005). She also competes in the German team in the 4 × 400 metres relay. She won the 400 metres at the German Athletics Championships in 2003 and 2004 and in the National Indoor Championships in 2005. She is 1.72 metres tall and weighs 59 kg. She currently studies sport sciences at the Humboldt University of Berlin. she came 4th in 400m hurdles.

Best performances 
2006
2006 European Athletics Championships (Gothenburg)
(400m Hurdles), 4th place (54.99)
2005
10th IAAF World Championships in Athletics (Helsinki)
(400m Hurdles), Semi Final, 5th Place (55.64)
SPAR European Cup (Firenze)
(400m Hurdles), Bronze Medal (55.73)

2002
27th European Indoor Championships (Vienna)
(400m), Silver Medal (52.15)

2001
8th IAAF World Championships in Athletics (Edmonton, Canada)
(4 by 400m Relay), Silver Medal (With Florence Ekpo-Umoh, Shanta Ghosh and Grit Breuer) (3:21.97).

1997
World Junior Championship
(4 by 400m Relay), Bronze Medal

Personal bests 
 400 metres: 51.41 seconds at Stuttgart on 30 June 2001.
 400 metres hurdles: 54.80 seconds at Gothenburg on 9 August 2006.

External links 
 

1978 births
Living people
Athletes from Berlin
German female sprinters
German female hurdlers
German national athletics champions
Olympic athletes of Germany
Athletes (track and field) at the 2004 Summer Olympics
Humboldt University of Berlin alumni
World Athletics Championships medalists
European Athletics Championships medalists
World Athletics Indoor Championships medalists
People from East Berlin